is a large area of sand dunes located to the east of the village of Higashidōri in northeastern Aomori Prefecture, facing the Pacific Ocean. They are also known as the  because of their location on Shimokita Peninsula.

Behind the sand dunes lie ponds and marshes forming an important wildlife habitat.

Almost all of the area of the Sarugamori Sand Dunes are used for military training by Japan's Ministry of Defense, and generally off-limits to tourists.

References

External links
Japan's Ministry of Defense Shimokita Test Grounds 
Shimokita Geopage home page 
Article in Directo a Japón 

Higashidōri, Aomori
Landforms of Aomori Prefecture
Dunes of Japan
Wetlands of Japan